Nuwakot may refer to several places:

 Nuwakot District, a district of Nepal
 Nuwakot 1 (constituency)
 Nuwakot 2 (constituency)
 Nuwakot, Arghakhanchi, town in Arghakhanchi district, Nepal
 Nuwakot, Nuwakot, town in Nuwakot district, Nepal
 Nuwakot, Western Rukum, former village development committee in Western Rukum district, Nepal